Huw Pritchard (born 7 January 1976 in Cardiff, Wales), is a former Welsh racing cyclist. He represented Wales at the 1998 Commonwealth Games in Kuala Lumpur, and again in Manchester in the 2002 Commonwealth Games, where he won the silver medal in the 20 km scratch, the first Welshman to win a medal on the track at the Games.  Huw now works as a product designer.

Palmarès

Track
1998
4th Team Pursuit, 4m28.664, Commonwealth Games (with Paul Sheppard, Alun Owen & Sion Jones)

1999
1st 20 km Scratch, British National Track Championships
2nd Points race, British National Track Championships

2002
2nd Madison, British National Track Championships (with Kieran Page, SP Systems)
2nd 20 km Scratch, Commonwealth Games
4th Points race, Commonwealth Games
4th Team Pursuit, 4m25.029, Commonwealth Games (with Paul Sheppard, Will Wright & Joby Ingram-Dodd)

2003
1st Madison, British National Track Championships (with James Taylor, City of Edinburgh RC)

Road
1997
1st British National Road Race Championships – U23
1999
1st Welsh National Road Race Championships
2nd Tour of Lancashire overall
2nd Manx International
2000
1st Stage 7, Tour of Serbia
2nd Lancaster Mercedes GP, Premier Calendar event
3rd Archer GP, Premier Calendar event
2002
1st Lincoln Grand Prix
2003
1st Welsh National Road Race Championships

External links
2002 Commonwealth Games profile

1976 births
Living people
Commonwealth Games silver medallists for Wales
Cyclists at the 1998 Commonwealth Games
Cyclists at the 2002 Commonwealth Games
Sportspeople from Cardiff
Welsh track cyclists
Welsh male cyclists
Commonwealth Games medallists in cycling
Medallists at the 2002 Commonwealth Games